Dani Hatakka (born 12 March 1994) is a Finnish football player who plays for Icelandic club Keflavík.

References

External links
 Profile at veikkausliiga.com 
 Dani Hatakka at Palloverkko 
 
 
 Interview with Dani Hatakka at www.Escapetosuomi.com (in English)

1994 births
Living people
Footballers from Espoo
Association football central defenders
Finnish footballers
Finland youth international footballers
Finland under-21 international footballers
FC Honka players
AC Oulu players
SK Brann players
Kuopion Palloseura players
IL Hødd players
Seinäjoen Jalkapallokerho players
Knattspyrnudeild Keflavík players
Eliteserien players
Norwegian First Division players
Veikkausliiga players
Ykkönen players
Kakkonen players
Úrvalsdeild karla (football) players
Finnish expatriate footballers
Expatriate footballers in Norway
Finnish expatriate sportspeople in Norway
Expatriate footballers in Iceland
Finnish expatriate sportspeople in Iceland